Zeale nigromaculata is a species of beetle in the family Cerambycidae. It was described by Johann Christoph Friedrich Klug in 1829. It is known from Argentina, Brazil, Paraguay, and Uruguay.

References

Hemilophini
Beetles described in 1829